Volha Samusik (January 7, 1985, Minsk — December 7, 2010, Minsk) was a Belarusian rock singer and journalist.

Biography and career 
Volha was born on January 7, 1985, in Minsk (Belarusian SSR).

She studied at Minsk school №146 from 1991 to 1995, then moved to school №189, which she graduated in 2002. In the same year she entered the Faculty of Journalism of BSU. While studying, she contributed to Muzykalnaya Gazeta, Narodnaja Volya, Belorusskaya Delovaya Gazeta, and other outlets. In 2007–2008 she worked as a journalist at the “Novaye Radio,” anchored the show “Antipop.” After graduation in 2008, she was distributed to the newspaper Sovetskaya Belorussiya – Belarus' Segodnya.

Volha was the vocalist of the rock bands Tarpach (2005–2009), žygimont VAZA (2004—2010), and Hasta La Fillsta (2009—2010). She also collaborated with the bands B:N:, Neuro Dubel, ZM99, and Lavon Volski.

She was named a Rock-Princess at the ceremony “Rock Coronation-2007,” which was held in Minsk on February 29, 2008. 

As a vocalist of the band Tarpach at the Rock-kola festival in 2007, she won a prize for best vocals, while her band won the grand prix.

Sickness and death 
Volha Samusik died exactly a month before her 26th birthday, on December 7, 2010, from a prolonged pneumonia. She underwent three serious operations, after the third one on the night of December 6–7, the girl did not recover.

The concert in honor of Volha Samusik was organized by her girlfriend Zoya Sakhonchik from the band ZM99 in December 2011. During the musical evening, Alexander Rakovets and his band IQ48, Anastasia Shpakovskaya, Leonid Narushevich and his band Knyaz Myshkin, Oleg Khamenka, Alexander Pamidorau, Alexander Kullinkovich and Yuri Naumov (both of Neuro Dubel), and others appeared on the stage of the Minsk club "Loft." The money raised was given to Volha's parents for a monument.

Appraisal 
In the report from the joint-concert with the participation of Tarpach in 2008, Alena Sobolevskaya, concert columnist for LiveSound.by, highlighted the choreography and vocal abilities of the “excellent music journalist (vocalist).”

Oleg “О’К” Klimov, editor-in-chief of Muzykalnaya Gazeta, recalled Volha as an excellent employee who “always made interesting and cool materials, offered ideas by herself;” from the musical side, in his opinion, she was most successfully realized in the band žygimont VAZA. Guitarist of Tarpach Dmitry Astapuk remembered that Volha “was a creative person, capable of a lot of things.” The founder and producer of the “Rock Coronation” Yury Tsybin spoke about “a phenomenon in Belarusian rock and roll.” Guitarist of Hasta La Fillsta Siarhei Kananovich felt the energy from the person “who wanted to live rock music.” Reminiscenting about joint-projects, Lavon Volski praised her for responsibility and professionalism.

Discography 
 2005 — žygimont VAZA — Distortion
 2010 — Lavon Volski — Такого няма нідзе
 2010 — Hasta La Fillsta — № 1
 2011 — Tribute to Neuro Dubel

Videography 
 žygimont VAZA — Distortion
 Tarpach — Я люблю людзей
 Tarpach — Нечакана
  Lavon Volski — Такого няма нідзе
 Neuro Dubel — 20 лет в тумане

References

Belarusian State University alumni
Deaths from pneumonia in Belarus
1985 births
2010 deaths
Journalists from Minsk
Belarusian rock musicians
21st-century Belarusian women singers
Musicians from Minsk